The 2017–18 Incarnate Word Cardinals women's basketball team represented the University of the Incarnate Word in the 2017-18 NCAA Division I women's basketball season. They were led by coach Christy Smith, in her second season. The Cardinals finished the season 5–24, 4–14 in Southland play to finish in eleventh place. They failed to qualify for the Southland women's tournament.

Roster

Schedule

|-
!colspan=8 style=""|Non-conference regular season
|-

|-
!colspan=8 style=""|Southland regular season
|-

Schedule source:

See also
2017–18 Incarnate Word Cardinals men's basketball team

References

Incarnate Word
Incarnate Word Cardinals women's basketball seasons
Incarnate Word
Incarnate Word